Several bodies or treaties are known as European Convention.

Bodies of the European Union
 European Convention (1999–2000) which drafted the:
 Charter of Fundamental Rights of the European Union (2000 / 2009)
 Convention on the Future of Europe (2001–2003) which drafted the:
 Treaty establishing a Constitution for Europe (2004), rewritten into the Treaty of Lisbon (2007 / 2009)

A body for amending the Treaties of the European Union
 European Convention, called to draft a new or amend an existing Treaty of the European Union, uniquely composed of representatives of the national Parliaments, of the Heads of State or Government of the Member States, of the European Parliament and of the Commission, as regulated in the Art. 48 (3) of the Treaty on European Union (Lisbon Treaty)

European treaties
The most known one is the:
 European Convention on Human Rights (ECHR), formally: European Convention for the Protection of Human Rights and Fundamental Freedoms, a human rights treaty (1950 / 1953)

Other treaties or organizations include:

 European Convention for Constructional Steelwork (ECCS)
 European Convention for the Protection of Pet Animals
 European Convention on Bioethics
 European Convention on Cinematographic Co-production
 European Convention on Extradition
 European Convention on Information on Foreign Law
 European Convention on International Commercial Arbitration
 European Convention on Mutual Assistance in Criminal Matters
 European Convention on Nationality
 European Convention on Recognition and Enforcement of Decisions concerning Custody of Children and on Restoration of Custody of Children (1980–1983)
 European Convention on Social and Medical Assistance
 European Convention on State Immunity
 European Convention on the Calculation of Time-Limits
 European Convention on the Equivalence of Diplomas leading to Admission to Universities
 European Convention on the Profession of Lawyer (CCBE)
 European Convention on the Protection of the Archaeological Heritage
 European Convention on the Recognition of the Legal Personality of International Non-Governmental Organisations
 European Convention relating to the Formalities required for Patent Applications

See also
 List of Council of Europe treaties